Mount Lawson was named by Walter Wilcox and H.G. Bryant in 1922. It is located in the Kananaskis Range in Alberta.
It was named in 1922 by Walter D. Wilcox and H.G. Bryant after Major W.E. Lawson, an employee with the Geological Survey of Canada who was killed in France during World War I.

See also
 Mountains of Alberta

References

Lawson
Alberta's Rockies